Adelzhausen is a municipality in Aichach-Friedberg district, in Bavaria, southern Germany.

The municipality covers an area of 16.97 km². Of the total population of 1,506, 775 are male, and 731 are female (Dec 31, 2002). The population density of the community is 89 inhabitants per km².

References

External links 
Adelzhausen - Official site
MS-SCHMAUS - International shipping, Earth moving, Recycling, Specialised engineering

Aichach-Friedberg